SweetLabs is a software distribution company.

Company overview
Based in San Diego and Seattle, SweetLabs has raised $21.5 million in venture capital from Bessemer Venture Partners, Google Ventures, Intel Capital, and O’Reilly AlphaTech Ventures.

Apps services
The company supplies products for software developers, advertisers, consumers, and manufacturers (“OEMs”) of Android-operated devices and Microsoft Windows-based devices and personal computers. In May 2014, SweetLabs released the App Install Platform, cloud-based and client-side services which include an App Ad Server that gives OEMs the ability to customize and manage the apps that are delivered to devices;  an App Ad Network that opens a marketplace of app developers bidding for app install ads; and App and Device Analytics that provides real-time analysis of app installs and devices. As of 2014 SweetLabs was the driver for about 1 million app installs per day, and powered app distribution software for device manufactures including Acer, Toshiba, and the world’s largest PC manufacturer, Lenovo.
In June 2011, SweetLabs launched the Pokki, a free application framework software to bring a modern Start Menu replacement to Microsoft Windows 8 and app store to access and discover apps on Windows computers. In January 2014, SweetLabs had driven 50 million installs of Pokki software on Windows-powered devices.

Pokki start menu
Pokki Start menu is a start menu replacement for Windows 8 PCs. The Pokki Start menu returns core functionality of the Windows Start Menu, including central point to find and launch programs and apps, access folders and files, search their computer and the web, manage settings, and shut down. The Pokki Start menu also includes a centralized notification center, a smartphone-like home screen to organize apps, sites, files, folders, an app recommendation service, and access to free web and desktop apps like Pixsta (Instagram desktop app). The Pokki App Store, included in the download, is an app store for free, connected, and downloadable Windows desktop apps and games.

Pokki is classified as "viruses and spyware" by Sophos AV.

OpenCandy
Sweetlabs also produced OpenCandy, an Adware module classified as malware by many anti-virus vendors. They flag OpenCandy due to its undesirable side-effects.

See also
 OpenCandy

References

External links
 

Software distribution platforms
2008 establishments in the United States